The Azules de Veracruz (Veracruz Blues) were a professional baseball team from Veracruz, Mexico that played in the Mexican League from 1941 to 1951. They won League pennants in 1940, 1941, 1944 and 1951, but were eventually shut down in favor of the other local team, the Águila de Veracruz.

Notable players

Ace Adams
Cool Papa Bell
Ramón Bragaña
Ray Brown
Alex Carrasquel
Tony Castaño
Buzz Clarkson
Ray Dandridge
Tommy de la Cruz
Leon Day
Martín Dihigo
Bobby Estalella
Harry Feldman
Pedro Formental
Silvio García
Danny Gardella
Josh Gibson
Chile Gómez
Vince Gonzales
Roy Henshaw
Chico Hernández
Bobby Herrera
Rogers Hornsby
Monte Irvin
León Kellman
Lou Klein
Max Lanier
Rufus Lewis
Agapito  Mayor
Charlie Mead
René Monteagudo
Julio Moreno
Baby Ortiz
Mickey Owen
Roy Partlow
Paul Pettit
Ted Radcliffe
Armando Roche
Héctor Rodríguez
Lázaro Salazar
Pat Scantlebury
Red Steiner
Vern Stephens
Willie Wells
Miguel Arvizu

 Sources Baseball Reference

Year-by-year record

External links
Footage from a 1946 game

Baseball teams established in 1940
Sports clubs disestablished in 1951
Defunct baseball teams in Mexico
Defunct Mexican League teams
Baseball teams disestablished in 1951